Clifford Merrick (3 July 1915 – May 2004) was an English professional footballer who played as a wing half. He was born in Todmorden, West Riding of Yorkshire and played over 50 matches in the Football League for Burnley and Swindon Town during the 1930s.

References

1915 births
2004 deaths
People from Todmorden
English footballers
Association football defenders
Burnley F.C. players
Swindon Town F.C. players
English Football League players
Date of death missing
Sportspeople from Yorkshire